Ernesto Bertea (1836–1904) was an Italian painter, mainly of landscapes and genre paintings.

Biography
He was born and lived in Turin. He studied with Ernesto Allason, then was influenced by the Swiss painter Edmond Castan and finally to the painter of the Barbizon School of Constant Troyon in Paris.

He also worked in painting ceramics and watercolors. At the 1880 Esposizione Nazionale of Turin del 1880, he displayed: La Chiavica; Rio Secco; A Pasture in Flatlands; In val d'Aosta; and Bay of Pollenza; as well as three watercolors: Pecarry in Pasture; Mill; and Prime foglie. At the 1883 Exhibition of Fine Arts in Rome he exhibited Patrimonio di Beppino,: Novembre; L'antico porto di fondo Foce sul Lago Maggiore. He also displayed Il Mucrone d'Andarne, at the 1887 Esposizione di Belle Arti of Venice .

References

External links

1836 births
1904 deaths
Painters from Turin
19th-century Italian painters
Italian male painters
20th-century Italian painters
19th-century Italian male artists
20th-century Italian male artists